Ceraia may refer to:
Ceraia (plant), a genus of orchids now treated as a synonym of Dendrobium
Ceraia (katydid), a genus of katydids in the Phaneropterinae